The Cal 35 Cruise is an American sailboat that was designed by C. William Lapworth as a cruiser and first built in 1973.

The Cal 35 Cruise is sometimes confused with the later Cal 35 series of sailboats.

Production
The design was built by Cal Yachts in the United States. Production was started in 1973 and ended in 1974, with a total of 120 examples of the design produced.

Design
The Cal 35 Cruise is a recreational keelboat, built predominantly of fiberglass, with wood trim. It has a masthead sloop rig or optional ketch rig, with a keel-stepped mast. The boat has a raked stem, a plumb transom, an internally mounted spade-type rudder controlled by a wheel and a fixed fin keel. It displaces  and carries  of ballast.

The engine is located under the companionway steps.

The design has a raised saloon top, with the galley on the port side at the foot of the companionway steps. The head is located forward, just aft of the bow "V"-berth and also on the port side. A dinette table is fitted in the main cabin. Opening hatches are provided for ventilation in the forward cabin and the main cabin.

Variants
Cal 35 Cruise Sloop
This model was introduced in 1973 and has a masthead sloop rig.
Cal 35 Cruise Ketch

See also
List of sailing boat types

Similar sailboats

C&C 34/36
C&C 35
Express 35
Goderich 35
Hughes 36
Hughes-Columbia 36
Hunter 35 Legend
Hunter 35.5 Legend
Island Packet 35
Landfall 35
Mirage 35
Pilot 35

References

Keelboats
1970s sailboat type designs
Sailing yachts
Sailboat type designs by Bill Lapworth
Sailboat types built by Cal Yachts